The Bristol Channel (literal translation: "Severn Sea") is a major inlet in the island of Great Britain, separating South Wales from Devon and Somerset in South West England. It extends from the lower estuary of the River Severn to the North Atlantic Ocean. It takes its name from the English city of Bristol, and is over 30 miles (50 km) wide at its western limit.

Long stretches of both sides of the coastline are designated as Heritage Coast. These include Exmoor, Bideford Bay, the Hartland Point peninsula, Lundy Island, Glamorgan, Gower Peninsula, Carmarthenshire, South Pembrokeshire and Caldey Island.

Geography
The International Hydrographic Organization now defines the western limit of the Bristol Channel as "a line joining Hartland Point in Devon to St. Govan's Head in Pembrokeshire". The IHO previously put the western limit at a line from Trevose Head in Cornwall to Skomer Island in Pembrokeshire, in an area now considered part of the Celtic Sea.

The upper limit of the Channel is between Sand Point, Somerset (immediately north of Weston-super-Mare) and Lavernock Point (immediately south of Penarth in South Wales). East of this line is the Severn Estuary. Western and northern Pembrokeshire and north Cornwall are outside the defined limits of the Bristol Channel, and are considered part of the seaboard of the Atlantic Ocean or more specifically, the Celtic Sea.
 
Taken as a single entity, the Bristol Channel/Severn Estuary system extends eastward to the limit of tidal influence near Gloucester. The channel shoreline alternates between resistant and erosional cliff features, interspersed with depositional beaches backed by coastal sand dunes; in the Severn Estuary, a low-lying shoreline is fronted by extensive intertidal mudflats. The Severn Estuary and most of the embayments around the channel are less than 30' (10 metres) in depth. Within the channel, however, there is an E-W trending valley 65' to 100' (20 to 30 metres) in depth that is considered to have been formed by fluvial run-off during Pleistocene phases of lower sea level. Along the margins of the Bristol Channel are extensive linear tidal sandbanks that are actively dredged as a source of aggregates and in the Outer Bristol Channel off the Welsh coast are the OBel Sands, an extensive area of sand waves up to 62' (19 metres) high, covering an area of over 400 sq. mi. (1,000 km2).

Ecology

The Bristol Channel is an important area for wildlife, in particular waders, and has protected areas, including national nature reserves such as Bridgwater Bay at the mouth of the River Parrett. Development schemes have been proposed along the channel, including an airport and a tidal barrier for electricity generation, but conservation issues have so far managed to block such schemes.

The largest islands in the Bristol Channel are Lundy, Steep Holm and Flat Holm, which are mostly uninhabited and protected as nature reserves, and are home to some unique wild flower species. In 1971 a proposal was made by the Lundy Field Society to establish a marine reserve. Provision for the establishment of statutory Marine Nature Reserves was included in the Wildlife and Countryside Act 1981, and on 21 November 1986 the Secretary of State for the Environment announced the designation of a statutory reserve at Lundy. There is an outstanding variety of marine habitats and wildlife, and a large number of rare and unusual species in the waters around Lundy, including some species of seaweed, branching sponges, sea fans and cup corals.

The Bristol Channel has some extensive and popular beaches and spectacular scenery, particularly on the coasts of Exmoor and Bideford Bay in North Devon and the Vale of Glamorgan and Gower Peninsula on the Glamorgan coast. The western stretch of Exmoor boasts Hangman cliffs, the highest cliffs in mainland Britain, culminating near Combe Martin in the "Great Hangman", a 1,043 ft (318 m) 'hog-backed' hill with a cliff-face of 820 ft (250 m); its sister cliff the "Little Hangman" has a cliff-face of 716 ft (218 m). On the Gower Peninsula, at its western extremity is the Worms Head, a headland of Carboniferous Limestone which is approachable on foot at low tide only. The beaches of Gower (at Rhossili, for example) and North Devon, such as Croyde and Woolacombe, win awards for their water quality and setting, as well as being renowned for surfing. In 2004, The Times "Travel" magazine selected Barafundle Bay in Pembrokeshire as one of the twelve best beaches in the world. In 2007, Oxwich Bay made the same magazine's Top 12 best beaches in the world list, and was also selected as Britain's best beach for 2007.

Coastal cities and towns

The city of Swansea is the largest settlement on the Welsh coast of the Bristol Channel. Other major built-up areas include Barry (including Barry Island), Port Talbot and Llanelli. Smaller resort towns include Porthcawl, Mumbles, Saundersfoot and Tenby. The cities of Cardiff and Newport adjoin the Severn estuary, but lie upstream of the Bristol Channel itself.

On the English side, the resort towns of Weston-super-Mare, Burnham-on-Sea, Watchet, Minehead and Ilfracombe are located on the Bristol Channel. Barnstaple and Bideford are sited on estuaries opening onto Bideford Bay, at the westernmost end of the Bristol Channel. Just upstream of the official eastern limit of the Channel, adjoining the Severn estuary, is the city of Bristol, originally established on the River Avon but now with docks on the Severn estuary, which is one of the most important ports in Britain. It gives its name to the Channel, which forms its seaward approach.

Navigation
There are no road or rail crossings of the Bristol Channel so direct crossings are necessarily made by sea or air, or less directly by the road and rail crossings of the Severn estuary. The Channel can be a hazardous area of water because of its strong tides and the rarity of havens on the north Devon and Somerset coasts that can be entered in all states of the tide. Because of the treacherous waters, pilotage is an essential service for shipping. A specialised style of sailing boat, the Bristol Channel Pilot Cutter, developed in the area.

Paddle steamers
P & A Campbell, based in Bristol, was the main operator of pleasure craft, particularly paddle steamers, from the mid-19th century to the late 1970s, together with the Barry Railway Company. These served harbours along both coasts, such as Ilfracombe and Weston-super-Mare.

This tradition is continued each summer by the PS Waverley, the last seagoing paddle steamer in the world, built in 1947. The steamer provides pleasure trips between the Welsh and English coasts and to the islands of the channel.

Marine rescue services
The Burnham-on-Sea Area Rescue Boat (BARB) uses a hovercraft to rescue people from the treacherous mud flats on that part of the coast. A hovercraft was recently tested to determine the feasibility of setting up a similar rescue service in Weston-super-Mare. There are also RNLI lifeboats stationed along both sides of the Channel. In the Severn Estuary, in-shore rescue is provided by two independent lifeboat trusts, the Severn Area Rescue Association (SARA) and the Portishead and Bristol Lifeboat Trust.

Renewable energy

The Bristol Channel and Severn Estuary have the potential to generate more renewable electricity than any other in the UK. It has been stated that it would contribute significantly to UK climate change goals and European Union renewable energy targets. Earlier studies of a possible Severn Barrage included estimates of bed load transport of sand and gravel by tidal ebb and flood that would be interrupted if a solid dam were built across the Channel. More recently, the Severn Tidal Power Feasibility Study was launched in 2008 by the British Government to assess all tidal range technologies, including barrages, lagoons and others. The study will look at the costs, benefits and impacts of a Severn tidal power scheme and will help Government decide whether it could or could not support such a scheme. Some of the options being looked at may include a road crossing downstream of the existing crossings of the estuary.

1607 flood

On 30 January 1607 (New style) thousands of people were drowned, houses and villages swept away, farmland inundated and flocks destroyed when a flood hit the shores of the Channel. The devastation was particularly bad on the Welsh side, from Laugharne in Carmarthenshire to above Chepstow on the English border. Cardiff was the most badly affected town. There remain plaques up to 8 ft (2.4 m) above sea level to show how high the waters rose on the sides of the surviving churches. It was commemorated in a contemporary pamphlet "God's warning to the people of England by the great overflowing of the waters or floods."

The cause of the flood is uncertain and disputed. It had long been believed that the floods were caused by a combination of meteorological extremes and tidal peaks, but research published in 2002 showed some evidence of a tsunami in the Channel. Although some evidence from the time describes events similar to a tsunami, there are also similarities to descriptions of the 1953 floods in East Anglia, which were caused by a storm surge. It has been shown that the tide and weather at the time were capable of generating such a surge.

Religion

In 1835 John Ashley was on the shore at Clevedon with his son who asked him how the people on Flat Holm could go to church. For the next three months Ashley voluntarily ministered to the population of the island. From there he recognised the needs of the seafarers on the four hundred sailing vessels in the Bristol Channel and created the Bristol Channel Mission. He raised funds and in 1839 a specially designed mission cutter was built with a main cabin which could be converted into a chapel for 100 people, this later became first initiative of the Mission to Seafarers.

Recreation

Surfing
Much of the coastline at the western end of the Bristol Channel faces west towards the Atlantic Ocean meaning that a combination of an off-shore (east) wind and a generous Atlantic swell produces excellent surf along the beaches. The heritage coasts of the Vale of Glamorgan, Bideford Bay and Gower are, along with the Atlantic coasts of Pembrokeshire and Cornwall, the key areas for surfing in the whole of Britain. Although slightly overshadowed by the Atlantic coasts of North Cornwall and West Pembrokeshire, both Gower and Bideford Bay nevertheless have several superb breaks—notably Croyde in Bideford Bay and Langland Bay on Gower—and surfing in Gower and Bideford Bay is enhanced by the golden beaches, clean blue waters, excellent water quality and good facilities close by to the main surf breaks.

Windsurfing across the channel
The first known crossing of the Bristol Channel (from Swansea to Woody Bay, near Lynton, Devon) by a windsurfer was Adam Cowles in April 2006, apparently accidentally. Other windsurfers have reported making the crossing as a training exercise (Hugh Sim Williams) or as part of a windsurf around Britain (e.g. Jono Dunnett). The coastguard has stated that windsurf crossings of the channel are dangerous and should not be attempted without appropriate preparations.

Walking
The high quality of the landscape of much of both coasts of the Bristol Channel means that they are popular destinations for walkers. Sections of two national trails; the South West Coast Path and the Pembrokeshire Coast Path follow these shores, and the West Somerset Coast Path extends eastwards from the South West Coast Path to the mouth of the River Parrett. A continuous coastal path, the Wales Coast Path, was opened in May 2012 along the entire Welsh shore under the auspices of the Countryside Council for Wales.

Swimming records

First person to swim across the Bristol Channel
The first person to swim across the Bristol Channel was Kathleen Thomas, a 21-year-old woman from Penarth who swam to Weston-super-Mare on 5 September 1927. She completed the swim, nominally 11 miles but equivalent to 22 miles because of tidal flows, in 7 hours 20 minutes. In 2007 the achievement was marked by a plaque on the seafront at Penarth. There is also a plaque at Anchor Head in Weston-super-Mare.

Youngest person to swim across the Bristol Channel
In 1929, Edith Parnell, a 16-year-old schoolgirl, emulated Kathleen Thomas's swim from Penarth to Weston-super-Mare in 10 hours 15 minutes. Edith later became the first wife of Hugh Cudlipp the Welsh journalist and newspaper editor.

Ilfracombe to Swansea

Penarth to Clevedon
The youngest person to swim the Bristol Channel from Penarth to Clevedon is Gary Carpenter who in August 2007, at the age of 17, swam the channel in 5 hours 35 minutes. He held the record for the fastest swim across the Bristol Channel until 2020. Carpenter's coach Steve Price was the first person to swim from Penarth to Clevedon, in 1990.
In 2020 Joanne Jones swam from Penarth to Clevedon in a time of 5 hours, 27 minutes. Joanne was the first woman to swim this route, and holds the current record for fastest time.

References

 
Channels of England
Channels of Wales
Landforms of Devon
Landforms of Somerset
England–Wales border
River Severn
South West England
West Country
Marginal seas of the Atlantic Ocean